Joseph Jonas Samuels (March 21, 1905 – October 28, 1996), was a Major League Baseball pitcher who played in  with the Detroit Tigers. He batted and threw right-handed. Samuels had a 0–0 record, with a 16.50 ERA, in two games, in his one-year career.

He was born in Scranton, Pennsylvania, and died in Bath, New York.

External links

1905 births
1996 deaths
Major League Baseball pitchers
Baseball players from Pennsylvania
Sportspeople from Scranton, Pennsylvania
Detroit Tigers players